Cristiano Camillucci (born March 7, 1981 in Terni) is an Italian professional football player. He currently plays for UC Sinalunghese.

Biography

In January 2008 he joined Ancona. After Ancona was expelled from the professional league, he joined Alessandria in 1-year contract.

On 9 July 2011 he was signed by Sorrento along with Daniele Croce. Camillucci himself was offered a 1-year deal.

Camillucci joined UC Sinalunghese ahead of the 2019/20 season.

References

External links
 

1981 births
Living people
Italian footballers
Serie B players
Serie C players
Serie D players
A.S. Sambenedettese players
A.C. Sansovino players
A.C. Ancona players
U.S. Alessandria Calcio 1912 players
A.S.D. Sangiovannese 1927 players
A.S.D. Sorrento players
A.C. Cuneo 1905 players
Association football midfielders
A.C. Sangiustese players